Noriega: God's Favorite is a 2000 biographical made-for-television film starring Bob Hoskins as Manuel Noriega.

Synopsis
The film tells the story of the rise of general Manuel Antonio Noriega from utter poverty to military dictator of Panama. It chronicles his involvement with drug cartels as well as the U.S. government during the Iran–Contra affair.

Cast

Bob Hoskins as Manuel Noriega
Jeffrey DeMunn as Nuncio
Rosa Blasi as Vicky Amador
Luis Avalos as President Nicky Barletta
Denise Blasor as Felicidad Noriega
Nestor Carbonell as Major Moisés Giroldi
Tony Plana as Colonel Diaz-Herrera
Sabi Dior as Irwin
John Verea as Father Jorge
Richard Masur as Mark
David Marshall Grant as Drug dealer
Michael Sorich as Fidel Castro
Jorge Luis Abreu as Witch doctor
Edward Edwards as Oliver North
Susan Africa as Adela Giroldi
Ina Alegre as Prostitute
Ivan Allen as Newscaster
Ed Aquino as Giroldi's Man
Ed Bouffard as Newscaster
Janice Brillotes as Yacht woman
Jennifer Cain as Swiss receptionist
Ivo Cutzarida as Hugo Spadafora
Subas Herrero as Gabriel Arias
Tonyo Meléndez as Pepe Velasquez
Frank Roman as Cesar Rodriguez
Bart Suretsky as Kiki Pretelet
Veronica Veron as Chaquita

Reception
Reviews were generally positive. Anita Gates of The New York Times wrote, "If I had seen Bob Hoskins play Manuel Antonio Noriega earlier, I would have paid a lot more attention to the American invasion of Panama." Howard Rosenberg of the Los Angeles Times wrote that Bob Hoskins "captures best the contradictions of a man at once endearing and despicable." One reviewer wrote that "the hair-raising career of deposed Panamanian dictator Manuel Noriega surpassed even the surreal creations of many Latin American novelists, thus making him a natural movie subject". Hoskins was nominated for a Satellite Award for his role in the film.

References

External links
 

2000 television films
2000 films
2000 biographical drama films
CBS network films
Drama films based on actual events
Films directed by Roger Spottiswoode
Films set in Panama
Biographical films about military leaders
Biographical films about drug traffickers
Films about dictators
Biographical films about politicians
Cultural depictions of Panamanian people
Cultural depictions of politicians
Cultural depictions of Fidel Castro
2000s English-language films